Fred and Minnie Raber Farm, also known as the Raber-Hasselbring-Shaffer Farm and Raber-Robbins Farm, is a historic home and farm and national historic district located in Deer Creek Township, Carroll County, Indiana. The house was built in 1904–1905, and is a large -story, brick veneer frame dwelling with elements of Queen Anne and Colonial Revival style design.  It has a steeply pitched hip roof, one-story verandah, and paired Tuscan order columns.  Also on the property are the contributing gazebo, garage, chicken house, corn crib, scales site, iron fence, and barn.

It was listed on the National Register of Historic Places in 1992.

References

Farms on the National Register of Historic Places in Indiana
Historic districts on the National Register of Historic Places in Indiana
Queen Anne architecture in Indiana
Colonial Revival architecture in Indiana
Houses completed in 1905
Buildings and structures in Carroll County, Indiana
National Register of Historic Places in Carroll County, Indiana
1905 establishments in Indiana